The Fourteen Points of Jinnah were proposed by Muhammad Ali Jinnah in response to the Nehru report. It basically consisted of four Delhi proposals, the three Calcutta amendments, and demands for the continuation of separate electorates and reservation of seats for Muslims in government services and self-governing bodies. In 1928, an All Parties Conference was convened in reaction to the Simon Commission appointed to discuss parliamentary reform in British India. A committee was set up under Motilal Nehru. That committee prepared a report which is known as "Nehru Report". This report demanded "Dominion Status" for India. Separate electorates were refused and the reservation of seats for the Muslims of Bengal and Punjab was rejected. In this report, not a single demand of the Muslim League was upheld. 
In reaction to the Nehru Report,  Mr. Jinnah was authorized by the League to draft in concise terms the basis of any future constitution that was to be devised for India. Jinnah's aim was to safeguard the interests of Muslims. He, therefore, gave his 14 points. These points covered all of the interests of the Muslims at a heated time and in these 14 points Jinnah stated that it was the "parting of ways" and that he did not want and would not have anything to do with the Indian National Congress in the future. The League leaders motivated Jinnah to revive the Muslim League and give it direction. As a result, these points became the demands of the League and greatly influenced the Muslims' thinking for the next two decades until the establishment of Pakistan in 1947.

Background  

The report was given in a meeting of the council of the All India Muslim League on 9 March 1929. The Nehru Report was criticized by Muslim leaders Aga Khan and Muhammad Shafi. They considered it as a death warrant because it recommended joint electoral rolls for Hindus and Muslims.

Muhammad Ali Jinnah left for England in May 1928 and returned after six months. In March 1929, the Muslim League session was held in Delhi under the presidency of Jinnah. In his address to his delegates, he consolidated Muslim viewpoints under fourteen items and these fourteen points became Jinnah's 14 points and the manifesto of the All India Muslim League.

The Fourteen Points
 The form of the future constitution should be federal, with the residuary powers vested in the provinces.
 A uniform measure of autonomy shall be granted to all provinces. 
 All legislatures in the country and other elected bodies shall be constituted on the definite principle of adequate and effective representation of minorities in every province without reducing the majority in any province to minority or even equality.
 In the Central Legislature, Muslim representation shall not be less than one-third 
 Representation of communal groups shall continue to be by separate electorates: provided that it shall be open to any community, at any time, to abandon its separate electorate in favour of joint electorate.
 Any territorial distribution that might at any time be necessary shall not in any way affect the Muslim majority in Punjab, Bengal, and NWFP provinces.
 Full religious liberty shall be guaranteed to all communities.
 One-third representation shall be given to Muslims in both central and provincial cabinets.
 No bill or resolution shall be passed in any legislature if three-fourths of the members of any community in that body oppose the bill.
 Sindh  should be separated from Bombay to a province.
 Reforms should be introduced in the NWFP and Balochistan on the same footings as in the other provinces.
 Muslims should be given an adequate share in all services, having due regard to the requirement of efficiency.
The Constitution should embody adequate safeguards for the protection of Muslim culture, education, language, religion, and personal laws, as well as for Muslim charitable institutions.
 No change will be made in the constitution without the consent of the province.

Reactions 
Jawaharlal Nehru referred to them as "Jinnah's ridiculous 14 points".

The congress leaders refused to accept the Jinnah amendments as Jinnah's proposals envisioned a weak centre and more autonomy to the provinces.

References 

Muhammad Ali Jinnah
Pakistan Movement
1929 documents
Constitution of Pakistan